The Nationwide Futsal Cup is a single futsal match played between league champions of Albania and Kosovo. It was established in 2010 in a match played in Pristina between FK Tirana of Tirana and FC Bamboo of Pristina.

After regular time ended 5-5, FK Tirana won by penalty shoot-outs and lifted the trophy for the first time.

The second final was played in Kumanovo between KS Ali Demi and FK Presevo. KS Ali Demi won 7-3, winning the Cup.

Champions

References

Albania
Futsal competitions in Albania
2010 establishments in Albania